Hubei University is a provincial public university in Wuhan, Hubei, China. 

The institute was founded in 1931 as Hubei Provincial Education College. The college moved between locations and changed its name several times during its half-century of development. Since 1984, it was renamed Hubei University.

History
1984 – Present:   Hubei University
1958 – 1984:       Wuhan Teachers College
1957 – 1958:       Wuhan Teachers Vocational School
1954 – 1957:       Hubei Teachers Vocational School
1952 – 1954:       Hubei Teachers Vocational College
1949 – 1952:       Hubei Education College
1944 – 1949:       National Hubei Teachers College
1931 – 1943:       Hubei Provincial Education College

Motto
日思日睿 笃志笃行

Everlasting work of mind sparks wisdom daily

Everlasting will of mind starts action really

Research

Key laboratories
Ministry of Education Key Laboratories for the Synthesis and Application of Organic Functional Molecules
Ministry of Education Key Laboratories for the Green Preparation and Application of Functional Materials
Hubei Polymer Materials Key Laboratory
Hubei Biotechnology of Traditional Chinese Medicine Key Laboratory
Hubei Ferroelectric and Piezoelectric Materials and Devices Key Laboratory
Hubei Provincial Key Laboratory of Applied Mathematics

Research centers

Center for American History Studies
Center for Art Teaching and Research
Center for Applied Linguistics Studies
Center for Computing Materials
Center for Drosophila Studies
Center for Education Information Technology Studies
Center for Foreign Language Studies
Center for Hubei Contemporary Culture Studies
Center for Japanese Issues Studies
Center for Master Degree of Education
Center for Nanometer Technology
Center for Package Materials Research and Development for Want-Want Group
Center for Polymer Latex Engineering
Center for Psychological Tutorship Studies
Center for Research and Manufacture of Biological-decomposition Materials
Center for Studies on Brand Development and Customer Relationships
Center for Studies on Faction of Jingchu Paintings
Center for Translation and Culture Studies
Center for Women’s Culture Studies
Hubei Provincial Center for Opening Economy Studies
Hubei Provincial Center for Tourism Development and Management
Hubei Provincial Center for Moralities and Civilization Studies

Research institutes

Institute of Ancient Chinese Bibliography
Institute of Applied Chemistry
Institute of Bio-chemistry and Molecular Biology
Institute of Chinese Language Studies
Institute of Chinese Ancient Literature
Institute of Ecology
Institute of Educational Science
Institute of Genetics
Institute of History of Chinese Ideology and Culture
Institute of Materials Science
Institute of Mathematics
Institute of Network Engineering of Taxation Information
Institute of Organic Chemistry
Institute of Philosophy
Institute of Piezoelectronic Ceremics Technology
Institute of Official Documents Writing
Institute of Signal Treatment and System Analysis
Institute of Theoretical Physics

Notable faculty
Andrew Jacobs, English teacher

References

 
Universities and colleges in Wuhan